Philip Allen Emery (born 25 June 1964) is a former Australian cricketer. A wicket-keeper and valuable left-handed batsman, he represented Australia internationally and New South Wales domestically.

Born in St Ives, Sydney, Emery was educated at Newington College Preparatory School, Lindfield (1969–72), and Shore School, North Sydney (1973–1982). At Shore, he was captain of cricket and captain of rugby and subsequently represented GPS teams in both sports.  He was also a very good swimmer and diver in his early school years. Emery represented Gordon at the Sydney Grade Cricket level. He then made his debut for the New South Wales Cricket team during the 1987–88 season replacing the previous wicketkeeper Greg Dyer.

Emery captained New South Wales to their 42nd Sheffield Shield title during the 1993–94 season while regular captain Mark Taylor was absent representing Australia.

He played in one Test and one ODI, both in Pakistan relieving Ian Healy who was out due to injury. This makes Emery only the third wicket-keeper (together with the long-serving Healy and Adam Gilchrist) to keep wicket in an Australian Test cricket team to Shane Warne (1992–2007) and Glenn McGrath (1993–2007) during their long Test careers.

See also
One-Test wonder

References

External links
 

1964 births
Living people
Australia One Day International cricketers
Australia Test cricketers
New South Wales cricketers
People educated at Newington College
People educated at Sydney Church of England Grammar School
Australian cricketers
Cricketers from Sydney
Wicket-keepers